Robert Rudolph Ivany (born February 4, 1947) is a retired major general in the United States Army, and was the eighth president of the University of St. Thomas in Houston.

Military career
Born in Austria to Hungarian war refugees, Ivany attended college at the United States Military Academy at West Point. In addition to earning a Bachelor of Science degree from the United States Military Academy in 1969, he received a Doctor of Philosophy in History from the University of Wisconsin–Madison in May 1980. His doctoral thesis was entitled The Exploited Emigres: The Hungarians in Europe, 1853-1861 and his  thesis advisor was Theodore S. Hamerow.

Serving as the commandant (president) of the War College capped Ivany's 34-year career in the army. During his various commands as an armored cavalry officer, he led soldiers in the United States, Kuwait, Saudi Arabia, the Federal Republic of Germany and Vietnam where he was wounded in action and decorated for valor.

When not assigned to troop units, Ivany assisted several nations in the transformation of their armed forces, including stints in Hungary, Saudi Arabia, and Kuwait. Ivany also served in several unique positions, including serving as the Army Aide to the President of the United States from 1984 to 1986.

Ivany also served as an assistant professor of history and as a football coach at the Military Academy at West Point. As the Commanding General of the Military District of Washington from 1998 to 2000, he directed a diverse organization of 5500 civilian and military employees based on seven installations in three states and the District of Columbia.

Prior to his retirement from the Army with the rank of major general, Ivany had presided over one of the nation's most respected institutions for the education of strategic leaders: the United States Army War College in Carlisle, Pennsylvania. There for three years, he instituted programs to develop the next generation of military and civilian leaders from the United States and 42 foreign countries to meet the challenges of cultural change, organizational transformation and a drastically altered national security environment.

Academia
After retiring from the army in October 2003, Ivany joined the faculty of the Graduate School of Business, Columbia University as an adjunct professor in Executive Education. He worked with senior executives in Great Britain, Canada, and the United States in leader development, strategic planning and cultural change.

On July 1, 2004, Ivany became the eighth president of the University of St. Thomas. He was formally installed into office in January 2005 at a reception which featured the presence of former United States President George Bush.  He resides in Houston with his wife, Marianne, and his children.

Ivany significantly increased the St. Thomas endowment during his short tenure. He has initiated several academic programs in an effort to increase the institution's prestige. He became president emeritus in 2017.

Athletics
During Ivany's tenure as president of the University of St. Thomas, he has made it a priority to develop intercollegiate athletics as a means to increase school spirit among students, alumni and donors. In the summer of 2005, Ivany called for the formation of the Athletics Advisory Council to study intercollegiate athletics at UST and make recommendations. The Council concluded that intercollegiate athletics would help the university's image and would not result in a reduction in funds for other programs. The program was initiated as the St. Thomas Celts.

Leadership Development Initiative
Ivany has spoken on the topic of leadership development to varied audiences, including:
 Cleveland City Club
 2002 Peter F. Drucker Conference for Nonprofit Management
 Union League of Philadelphia
 First Friday Club of Cleveland
 Atlanta Rotary
 Northeast Regional United Way Conference
 Quanex Corporation
 CenterPoint Energy
 Walt Disney Resorts
 Houston Junior Achievement
 Houston Partnership Board.

Ivany has been interested in the leadership challenges facing military and civilian leaders for several years. His article "Soldiers and Legislators: A Common Mission" appeared in Parameters in 1990 and received the General Dwight D. Eisenhower Award for Excellence in Military Writing. He is conducting research on the leadership attributes of 20 generals and admirals who have transitioned to corporate leadership.

Memberships and awards
Ivany belongs to the Leader to Leader Institute, the Army Football Club, Mental Health Association and the Knights of Columbus. He has received the Ellis Island Medal of Freedom, the Humanitarian Medal from the Chapel of the Four Chaplains Association, the Director's Award from the US Secret Service, the Admiral Thomas J. Hamilton Award for Leadership, and together with his spouse, the Aaron and Hur Award from the U.S. Army Chaplaincy. He was named a distinguished graduate of St. Ignatius H.S., Cleveland, Ohio and has earned numerous military awards.

Family
Ivany is married to the former Marianne O'Donnell; they have four children, daughter Julianne Sara and sons Brian Michael, Mark and Chris.

References

External links
 Dr. Ivany Biography
 Monday Morning Magyar: Major Gen. Robert Ivany

1947 births
United States Army personnel of the Gulf War
United States Army personnel of the Vietnam War
Catholics from Texas
Columbia University faculty
Living people
Military personnel from Cleveland
Military personnel from Houston
American people of Hungarian descent
Recipients of the Defense Distinguished Service Medal
Recipients of the Defense Superior Service Medal
Recipients of the Distinguished Service Medal (US Army)
Recipients of the Legion of Merit
United States Military Academy alumni
University of Wisconsin–Madison College of Letters and Science alumni
University of St. Thomas (Texas) faculty